Westar is an American satellite telecommunication system.

Westar may refer to:

 Westar Energy, an American electric utility
 Westar Institute, a non-profit institute promoting religious literacy
 Westar Rules, the name used by the West Australian Football League between 1997 and 2000

See also

 Wester (disambiguation)
 West (disambiguation)
 Star (disambiguation)
 
 Western Star (disambiguation)
 Star of the West (disambiguation)